Stellar Data Recovery is a data recovery utility for Windows, macOS and iOS developed by Stellar.

Platforms

Windows 
The Windows version was previously known as Stellar Phoenix Windows Data Recovery.

Mac 
The Mac version was previously known as Stellar Phoenix Mac Data Recovery.

See also 
 List of data recovery software
 List of data-erasing software

References

External links

Data recovery
Utilities for Windows
Data recovery software
Hard disk software
2017 software
Windows-only freeware
Freeware